Denis Horgan (18 May 1871 – 2 June 1922) was a champion Irish athlete and weight thrower, born in Banteer, County Cork, who competed mainly in the shot put.

Biography
Shortly after setting a world's record of 48 feet 2 inches with the 16 pound shot at Queenstown, in County Cork, Ireland in 1897, Horgan visited the U.S., and in 1900, he joined the Greater New York Irish Athletic Association, the predecessor of the Irish American Athletic Club for a brief period. In 1905, he joined the rival New York Athletic Club.

In 1906, Horgan set the world's record for the 28 pound shot, with a distance of 35 feet, 4.5 inches at the Ancient Order of Hibernians games held at Celtic Park in Queens, New York.
 
He competed for Great Britain in the 1908 Summer Olympics held in London in the shot put, where he won the silver medal.

Denis Horgan won a total 42 shot put titles during his athletic career, including 28 Irish championships, 13 English championships (all for the 16 pound shot) and one American championship. Horgan was "usually so superior to his fellow competitors that he seldom trained in any sort of systematic way, yet he showed a marked consistency of performance, in all conditions, over a period of twenty years."

He emigrated to America where he worked as a police officer. Whilst attempting to rescue a fellow Irishman he was severely stabbed and left for dead. After he recovered he returned to Ireland, married, and settled in Crookstown.

Notes

External links

profile
Winged Fist Organization

1871 births
1922 deaths
Irish male shot putters
Olympic athletes of Great Britain
Athletes (track and field) at the 1908 Summer Olympics
Olympic silver medallists for Great Britain
Sportspeople from County Cork
Medalists at the 1908 Summer Olympics
Olympic silver medalists in athletics (track and field)